The 1990–91 Campionato Sammarinese di Calcio season was the 6th season since its establishment. It was contested by 10 teams, and S.C. Faetano won the championship.

Regular season

Results

Championship playoff

First round
S.C. Faetano 3-0 S.S. Folgore/Falciano
S.S. Juvenes 4-2 S.S. Montevito

Second round
S.S. Folgore/Falciano 0-1 S.S. Montevito
S.C. Faetano 2-1 S.S. Juvenes

Third round
S.S. Juvenes 2-1 S.S. Montevito
S.P. Tre Fiori 4-1 S.C. Faetano

Semifinal
S.C. Faetano 3-1 S.S. Juvenes

Final
S.C. Faetano 1-0 S.P. Tre Fiori

References
San Marino - List of final tables (RSSSF)

Campionato Sammarinese di Calcio
San Marino
1990–91 in San Marino football